Thompson Dorfman Sweatman LLP (TDS) is a Canadian, Manitoba-based law firm with its head office in Winnipeg. The firm has two full-time regional office in Brandon and Portage la Prairie and eight part-time satellite offices in Boissevain, Gladstone, MacGregor, Morden, Neepawa, Saskatoon, Steinbach, and Winkler.

On 27 May 2010, Thompson Dorfman Sweatman announced a merger with the firm Perlov Stewart LLP, which became effective June 1 that year. Both firms continued under the name Thompson Dorfman Sweatman LLP. On 14 January 2013, the firm announced a merger with the Portage la Prairie firm Christianson Law. On 7 January 2014, the firm announced another merger with the Brandon firm Roy Johnston & Co.

TDS has lawyers who provide services to its clients in both Official Languages of Canada and also in Amharic (spoken), Cantonese, German, Hebrew, Italian, Mandarin, Persian, Portuguese and Tagalog. TDS was one of the founding members of Lex Mundi, an association of independent law firms and continue to be its only Manitoba-based firm.

Affiliated companies
On 27 May 2009 Thompson Dorfman Sweatman LLP announced the launch of Acumen Corporate Development Inc., an affiliate of the firm.  Acumen focused on providing North American companies with a structured, comprehensive approach to the planning and execution of growth by acquisition, financing and other strategic opportunities.

On 27 May 2010, TDS announced a merger with the firm Perlov Stewart LLP, which became effective June 1 that year. Both firms continued under the name Thompson Dorfman Sweatman LLP. On 14 January 2013, the firm announced a merger with the Portage la Prairie firm Christianson Law. On 7 January 2014, the firm announced another merger with the Brandon firm Roy Johnston & Co.

TDS was one of the founding members of Lex Mundi, an association of independent law firms and continue to be its only Manitoba-based firm.

Awards
The firm has received awards and distinctions from third party organizations including Chambers Global, Lexpert,  Best Lawyers, Benchmark Litigation, and Canadian Lawyer Magazine, which rated them one of the top corporate law firms in Manitoba.

Notable firm alumni
Andrew Swan
Alan MacInnes
Douglas Abra
Gord Mackintosh
Karen Simonsen
Lori Douglas
Nathan Nurgitz

References

External links
Official Website
Legal organizations based in Manitoba
Companies based in Winnipeg
Law firms established in 1887
Law firms of Canada